The women's BMX competition of the cycling events at the 2011 Pan American Games was held on October 21 at the CODE San Nicolás in Guadalajara. The defending champion is Maria Gabriela Diaz of Argentina.

Schedule
All times are Central Standard Time (UTC-6).

Results

Qualification
First 4 riders in each heat qualify to final.

Final

References

Cycling at the 2011 Pan American Games
Pan
BMX at the Pan American Games